The Hallmarking Act 1973 makes up the bulk of modern law regarding the assaying and hallmarking of metals in the United Kingdom.  Hallmarking is a way to guarantee the purity of precious metals.  Metals are tested and, if they meet a certain minimal purity requirement, are marked with a specified seal. In the United Kingdom (UK), this is done by the Assay Offices in London, Birmingham, Sheffield, and Edinburgh.  The Act made business transactions involving unmarked metals illegal.  Trading Standards departments are responsible for enforcing the Act.

Another notable consequence of the Act was the formation of the British Hallmarking Council (BHC).  This council is responsible for advising the Secretary of State in matters of hallmarking, making certain the UK has acceptable hallmarking facilities, and overseeing the Assay Offices so they follow the legal hallmarking standards. The council has made many important contributions concerning UK hallmarking procedures.  In 1992, the European Commission proposed a Directive meant to cover hallmarking.  The BHC examined the document and found multiple areas of ambiguity and deficiency.  When the European Parliament voted on the Council’s recommendations, many were approved.

The Hallmarking Regulations 1998 and The Hallmarking Order 1998 caused the legitimisation of hallmarks of other member states (those countries that ratified the Convention on the Control of Articles of Precious Metals of 1972).  The council was responsible for clearing up ambiguous statements in the regulations and for extending its definition to deal with other problems in the hallmarking law.  Some of these changes include seven additional standards of fineness, a change in the standard mark, and the dropping of the date requirement on marked metals.

References 

United Kingdom Acts of Parliament 1973